Yuri Rafailovich Yakovich (born November 30, 1962) is a Russian chess player. He was awarded the title of Grandmaster by FIDE in 1990. He was a member of the silver medal-winning Russian team at the 1997 European Team Chess Championship. In 2019, Yakovich was part of the Russian team that won the gold medal at the European Senior Team Championship in the 50+ category.

In 2003 he tied for 1st–3rd with Evgenij Miroshnichenko and Alexander Potapov in the Fakel Jamala tournament in Noyabrsk. In 2007, he tied for 1st–6th with Vitali Golod, Mateusz Bartel, Mikhail Kobalia, Michael Roiz and Zahar Efimenko in the 16th Monarch Assurance Isle of Man International tournament.

Yakovich is the author of the books Play the 4 f3 Nimzo-Indian, published by Gambit Publications in 2004, and Sicilian Attacks, published by New In Chess in 2010.

In 2021, the German Chess Federation named Yakovich the coach of their women's national team. He coached the team during the 44th Chess Olympiad in Chennai, India.

Notable games
Yuri Yakovich vs Vladimir Kramnik, USSR 1988, Sicilian Defense: Four Knights. Exchange Variation (B40), 1-0
Yuri Yakovich vs David Bronstein, It (open) 1994, Queen's Gambit Accepted: Classical Defense (D26), 1-0
Yuri Yakovich vs Magnus Carlsen, Bergen 2002, Queen's Indian Defense: Kasparov-Petrosian Variation (E12), 1-0

References

External links
Yuri Yakovich games at 365Chess.com

1962 births
Living people
Chess grandmasters
Soviet chess players
Russian chess players
Russian chess writers
Sportspeople from Samara, Russia